Pine Springs may refer to:

 Pine Springs, Minnesota
 Pine Springs, Texas
 Pine Springs, Ontario
 Pine Springs, Arizona